The Venerable Leveson Venables-Vernon-Harcourt (b  20 March 1788 – 26 July 1860) was Archdeacon of Cleveland from 3 December 1828 until 27 October 1832.
 
He was the son of Edward Venables-Vernon-Harcourt, born at Sudbury, Derbyshire. He matriculated at Christ Church, Oxford in 1806, graduating B.A. in 1810, and M.A. 1813,.  He was for many years Chancellor of the Diocese of York.

References

Alumni of Christ Church, Oxford
1788 births
19th-century English Anglican priests
Archdeacons of Cleveland
Chancellors of the Diocese of York
1860 deaths
People from Sudbury, Derbyshire